Andrew or Andy Davies may refer to:

Politics
Andrew Davies (Labour politician) (born 1952), Welsh Labour politician
Andrew RT Davies (born 1968), Welsh Conservative politician

Sports
Andrew Davies (British runner) (born 1979), British long-distance runner
Andrew Davies (Canadian runner) (born 2000), Canadian long-distance runner and competitor at the 2019 World Cross Country Championships
Andrew Davies (cricketer, born 1976), Welsh cricketer
Andrew Davies (cricketer, born 1962), former English cricketer
Andrew Davies (footballer) (born 1984), English defender
Andrew Davies (weightlifter) (born 1967), British weightlifter
Andy Davies (referee), English football referee

Other
Andrew Davies (writer) (born 1936), Welsh author and screenwriter
Andrew Davies (historian, born 1962), British academic
Andrew Davies (businessman) (born 1963), CEO designate of Carillion
Andrew Davies (darts player) (born 1983), Welsh darts player
Andrew Mark Davies (born 1966), president of Wind Telecomunicazioni Spa
Andy Davies (musician) (born 1981), Welsh jazz trumpeter
Andy J. Davies (born 1966), British musician, songwriter, audio engineer and record producer

See also
Andrew Davis (disambiguation)